The 1924 St. Louis Browns season involved the Browns finishing 4th in the American League with a record of 74 wins and 78 losses. This was George Sisler's first season as manager.

Regular season

Season standings

Record vs. opponents

Roster

Player stats

Batting

Starters by position 
Note: Pos = Position; G = Games played; AB = At bats; H = Hits; Avg. = Batting average; HR = Home runs; RBI = Runs batted in

Other batters 
Note: G = Games played; AB = At bats; H = Hits; Avg. = Batting average; HR = Home runs; RBI = Runs batted in

Pitching

Starting pitchers 
Note: G = Games pitched; IP = Innings pitched; W = Wins; L = Losses; ERA = Earned run average; SO = Strikeouts

Other pitchers 
Note: G = Games pitched; IP = Innings pitched; W = Wins; L = Losses; ERA = Earned run average; SO = Strikeouts

Relief pitchers 
Note: G = Games pitched; W = Wins; L = Losses; SV = Saves; ERA = Earned run average; SO = Strikeouts

Awards and honors

League top five finishers 
Urban Shocker
 #5 strikeouts (88)

Baby Doll Jacobson
 #3 home runs (19)
 #4 slugging percentage (.529)

Ken Williams
 #3 slugging percentage (.533)
 #4 home runs (18)

References 
1924 St. Louis Browns team page at Baseball Reference
1924 St. Louis Browns season at baseball-almanac.com

St. Louis Browns seasons
Saint Louis Browns season
St Louis